Currency is a 2009 Malayalam crime film by directed by Swathi Bhaskar starring Mukesh, Jayasurya, Kalabhavan Mani and Meera Nandan.

The film is inspired from the film The Man Who Copied.

Plot 
Keshu (Jayasurya) is a school drop-out. An introvert, he is working in a photocopy store, owned by Indrapalan (Suraj Venjaramood). Keshu is crazy about Rose (Meera Nandan), a sales girl in the nearby boutique.

Keshu often takes photocopies of currency notes which looks like real, but he fears to spend them. One day he meets Danny D'souza (Mukesh), an Anglo Indian, who realizes the competence of Keshu in creating fake currencies. Danny forces him to continue with his act. Danny gets the information that a popular party in Kerala is bringing 10 crores of rupees to Kerala from Bangalore by road. Danny makes a scene with the help of some rowdies and cleverly replaces the 10 crore real notes with fake ones. They hide the real notes in a slum under the supervision of Iruttu (Kalabhavan Mani).

When the political party starts spending the money, police gets the information and Paneer Raghavan, an Intelligence Bureau officer (Anoop Menon) starts investigating. In the meantime, Keshu's mom gets admitted in the hospital and Keshu immediately wants 25,000 to pay in the hospital. They go to Iruttu to take the money. There a fight erupts between Danny and Keshu. Iruttu, taking advantage of the situation, goes greedy and tries to take all the money by killing them. But Keshu hits Iruttu in the head and they escapes with the money.

Iruttu takes Rose as hostage and asks Keshu to return the money. Keshu pays the money and Iruttu escapes with it. But he was soon captured by the police and thus Danny and Keshu escapes the charges. They also get to know that they won the first prize of a lottery and they don't have to do any fraud activities to live from now on.

Cast 
 Jayasurya as Keshava Menon Aka Keshu
 Mukesh as Danny D'Souza Aka Sayippu
 Anoop Menon Paneer Raghavan, Intelligence Bureau Officer
 Kalabhavan Mani as Iruttu
 Meera Nandan as Rose
 Seetha as Subhadra, Keshu's Mother
 Mamukoya as Koyakka
 Suraj Venjaramood as Indrabalan
 Anoop Chandran as Danny D'Souza's helper

Reception
Paresh C. Palicha of Rediff gave the film a rating of two out of five stars and wrote that "Though this is Swathi Bhaskar's first feature film, he shows flair and competence. But for some unrealistic blemishes in the second half, he makes his Currency work". Sify wrote that "You've to admit this, director Swathi Bhaskar's Currency has a nice concept and has a fresh storyline as well. But for the viewer, what matters is the transformation of that idea on to the screen. That is exactly where the film loses its grip".

Controversy 
In 2022 the film gained notoriety in Brazil after Jorge Furtado, director of The Man Who Copied, found out about it through an IMDb entry for the Indian movie, Furtado alleged that Swathi Bhaskar copied the entire plot without asking for permission, but decided not to sue Bhaskar mentioning he found too hard to prosecute him on the Indian legal system.

References

External links 
 
 Currency at IndiaGlitz

2000s Malayalam-language films
2000s crime films
Indian crime films